I due timidi (in English, The Two Timid Ones) is a one-act radio opera (also described as a commedia lirica) composed in 1950 by Nino Rota with libretto by the film writer Suso Cecchi d'Amico.

Performance history
It was originally written as a radio production for Radio Audizioni Italiane and first performed, on air, on 15 November 1950. The first staged production was in London at the Scala Theatre (London Opera Club) on 17 March 1952. It was also given at the Teatro Petruzzelli in Bari on 18 January 1971, and at the Teatro Donizetti in Bergamo on 23 October 1972.

It was revived by the Wiener Kammeroper opera company in Vienna in 2007. and again by the Santa Fe Opera as part of their "One-Hour Opera" program in the spring of 2008.

Roles

Recordings
Rota: I due timidi, La notte di un nevrastenico, Orchestra Filarmonia Veneta 'G F Malipiero', Chorus of the Teatro Sociale di Rovigo Conductor: Flavio Emilio Scogna Principal singers: Paolo Drigo, Shin Young-Hoon, Sabrina Testa, Lorenzo Battagion, Nunzio Galli, Giuliano Scaranello Release date: 2005 Label: Bongiovanni 2367 (CD)'I due timidi / La notte di un nevrastenico Giorgio Celenza, Sabrina Cortese, Daniele Adriani, Antonio Sapio, Chiara Osella, and Carlo Feola Reate Festival Orchestra, led by Gabriele Bonolis, Dynamic 2CD or DVD 2019

References

External links

Montecchi, Giordano (1992), 'Rota, Nino' in The New Grove Dictionary of Opera'', ed. Stanley Sadie (London) 

Italian-language operas
Operas by Nino Rota
1950 operas
Radio operas
Operas
One-act operas